Kamchatka Strait is a 191 km-wide strait off the mainland coast of Kamchatka Krai in the Russian Far East.

Geography
It separates  the mainland on Kamchatka Peninsula from Bering Island, one of the Commander Islands group.

Kamchatka Strait connects the Bering Sea in the north with the Pacific Ocean in the south.

Straits of the Pacific Ocean
Straits of Russia
Bodies of water of the Bering Sea
Bodies of water of the Kamchatka Peninsula